The following is a list of governors of the Colonies of Vancouver Island and British Columbia.

See also

List of lieutenant governors of British Columbia
Colony of the Queen Charlotte Islands
Stickeen Territories

Governors
Governors